In mathematics - specifically, in measure theory - Fernique's theorem is a result about Gaussian measures on Banach spaces.  It extends the finite-dimensional result that a Gaussian random variable has exponential tails. The result was proved in 1970 by the mathematician Xavier Fernique.

Statement
Let (X, || ||) be a separable Banach space.  Let μ be a centred Gaussian measure on X, i.e. a probability measure defined on the Borel sets of X such that, for every bounded linear functional ℓ : X → R, the push-forward measure ℓ∗μ defined on the Borel sets of R by

is a Gaussian measure (a normal distribution) with zero mean.  Then there exists α > 0 such that

A fortiori, μ (equivalently, any X-valued random variable G whose law is μ) has moments of all orders: for all k ≥ 0,

References
  

 Giuseppe Da Prato and Jerzy Zabczyk, Stochastic equations in infinite dimension, Cambridge University Press, 1992. Theorem 2.7

Probability theorems
Theorems in measure theory